Christopher Pike is the name of:
 Christopher Pike (author) (born 1955), author who specializes in young adult thrillers
 Christopher Pike (Star Trek), a character in the fictional Star Trek universe
 Chris Pike (born 1961), Welsh former professional footballer
 Chris Pike (American football) (born 1964), former American football defensive tackle

See also
 Christian Pike, American neuroscientist